Archibald Battle Lovett (June 21, 1884 – December 28, 1945) was a United States district judge of the United States District Court for the Southern District of Georgia.

Education and career

Born in Sylvania, Georgia, Lovett attended Mercer University and read law to enter the bar in 1907. He was a prosecuting attorney of the Sylvania City Courts from 1914 to 1918, also serving as Mayor of Sylvania from 1914 to 1918. He was a Judge of the Superior Courts of Georgia from 1919 to 1921. He was in private practice in Savannah, Georgia from 1921 to 1941.

Federal judicial service

On September 8, 1941, Lovett was nominated by President Franklin D. Roosevelt to a seat on the United States District Court for the Southern District of Georgia vacated by Judge William H. Barrett. Lovett was confirmed by the United States Senate on October 2, 1941, and received his commission on October 7, 1941. Lovett served in that capacity until his death on December 28, 1945.

References

Sources
 

1884 births
1945 deaths
Mayors of places in Georgia (U.S. state)
Georgia (U.S. state) state court judges
Judges of the United States District Court for the Southern District of Georgia
United States district court judges appointed by Franklin D. Roosevelt
20th-century American judges
People from Sylvania, Georgia
People from Savannah, Georgia
United States federal judges admitted to the practice of law by reading law